Black Rodeo is a 1972 documentary by filmmaker Jeff Kanew.

Overview
Black Rodeo captures the events surrounding the first-time performance of an all African-American rodeo at Triborough Stadium on Randall's Island, N.Y.  The documentary shows that the people who attended the rodeo were awed to find African-American men and women actively involved in skills such as bronc riding, calf roping and brahma bull riding.

Actor Woody Strode attended the rodeo and appears in the film as its narrator. He imparts a number of stories that show the participation of blacks in the development of the American Old West.

The film captures the appearance of Muhammad Ali, who rides a horse on 125th Street (the main street in Harlem), trades friendly verbal jibes with the cowboys, straps on chaps and rides a bull.

The rodeo events in the film are set to the music of Aretha Franklin, Ray Charles, Little Richard, Lee Dorsey, Sammy Turner, Little Eva and other R&B acts.

The film was released by Cinerama Releasing in the spring of 1972.

See also
 List of American films of 1972

References

External links

1972 films
American sports documentary films
Documentary films about New York City
Documentary films about African Americans
Rodeo in film
1972 documentary films
Films directed by Jeff Kanew
Films set in Harlem
1972 directorial debut films
1970s English-language films
1970s American films